South Barwon Football & Netball Club, nicknamed the Swans, is an Australian rules football and netball club based in the southern suburb of Belmont, Victoria. The South Barwon teams currently compete in the Geelong Football Netball League, the major regional league in the region.

History
The club was formed from the Belmont Football Club and Barwon Football Club. These two clubs merged in 1990 to create the South Barwon Swans, and are now one of the largest clubs in country Victoria.

South Barwon has won eight premierships to date, their first in 2001 defeating North Shore in the final. The club then won three premierships in a row from 2005-07 defeating Newtown-Chilwell, St. Josephs and Bell Park respectively. The club won its fifth premiership in 2009 defeating St. Joseph's in the Grand Final played at Skilled Stadium. Further premierships were won in 2010, 2012, 2013. In 2008 South Barwon won under 18 premierships in both the GFL under 18's competition and the GFL under 18 B's competition and in 2009 won the premiership in the under 18 B's competition.  In 2011 they won the inaugural Best of the Best pre-season tournament, defeating the Maribyrnong Park Football Club from the Essendon District Football League in the final.

Premierships
 Geelong Football Netball League (8):
 2001, 2005, 2006, 2007, 2009, 2010, 2012, 2013

Notable players 
 Tom Stewart - 
 Scott Thompson -  
 Mark Blake - 
 Andrew Boseley - 
 Craig Biddiscombe - , 
 Paul Corrigan - 

Bibliography 
 Cat Country: History of Football In The Geelong Region by John Stoward –

Notes

References

External links

 Official website

Geelong Football League clubs
1990 establishments in Australia
Sports clubs established in 1990
Australian rules football clubs established in 1990
Netball teams in Victoria (Australia)